Rachid Nadji (born April 15, 1988) is an Algerian footballer who plays as a striker for HB Chelghoum Laïd.

On 16 February 2022, Nadji joined Saudi Arabian club Al-Nahda.

Honours

Club
 ES Sétif
 Algerian Ligue Professionnelle 1 (3): 2011-12, 2012-13, 2016-17
 Algerian Cup (1): 2012

 USM Alger
 Algerian Ligue Professionnelle 1 (1): 2015-16

References

Living people
1988 births
Algerian people
People from Dellys
People from Dellys District
People from Boumerdès Province
Kabyle people
Algerian footballers
Algerian expatriate footballers
Algerian Ligue Professionnelle 1 players
Saudi First Division League players
Association football forwards
ES Sétif players
MC Oran players
USM Alger players
NARB Réghaïa players
Al-Nahda Club (Saudi Arabia) players
Expatriate footballers in Saudi Arabia
Algerian expatriate sportspeople in Saudi Arabia
21st-century Algerian people